János Petrán (born 28 August 1934) is a former Hungarian diplomat and security agent, who served as Hungarian Ambassador to the United States between 1981 and 1983. After that he represented Hungary at the international organizations based in Vienna from 1983 to 1985.

References

Sources

External links
 Diplomatic Representation for Hungary
 Petrán János SZT-tiszt adatlap

1934 births
Living people
Hungarian diplomats
Hungarian politicians
Hungarian communists
Ambassadors of Hungary to the United States